The 1972 Drake Bulldogs football team represented Drake University during the 1972 NCAA University Division football season. It was the seventy-ninth year for the football program. The season ended with a 7–5 record, capturing the Missouri Valley Conference championship. The Bulldogs participated in the 1972 Pioneer Bowl.

Schedule

References

Drake
Drake Bulldogs football seasons
Missouri Valley Conference football champion seasons
Drake Bulldogs football